The First Class CW Operators' Club (usually known by the abbreviation FOC) is a club for amateur radio operators who regularly make use of Morse code.

The club originated in the United Kingdom and is still headquartered there but has members all over the world. Membership is by invitation only and is limited to 500 worldwide.

Many FOC members are prominent in the world of DXpeditions and amateur radio contesting, or are known for their skill in chasing DX. Many, too, are interested in having long conversations using morse code, often at high speed. The Club has an active social programme and many members engage in extensive travel to meet other members in person.

References
FOC Official Website

Amateur radio organizations